Hunter Creek is a stream in the U.S. state of Washington. It is a tributary of the Columbia River.

Hunter Creek James Hunter, a pioneer settler.

See also
List of rivers of Washington

References

Rivers of Stevens County, Washington
Rivers of Washington (state)